James Phinney Munroe (June 3, 1862 – February 2, 1929) was an American author, businessman, professor and genealogist of the Clan Munro. He attended the Massachusetts Institute of Technology and graduated in 1882, although remained active in the affairs of the school. He published a number of mostly scholarly works. He was the father-in-law of Frederic Lansing Day who married his daughter Katharine. Munroe, who lived in Lexington, Massachusetts, was a president of the Lexington Historical Society and Treasurer and President of the Munroe Felt and Paper Company. He edited the second edition of Charles Hudson's History of Lexington.

Biography
James Phinney Munroe was born in Lexington, Massachusetts on June 3, 1862.

He died in Boston on February 2, 1929.

Books
A Sketch of the Munro Clan: Also of William Munro Who Deported From Scotland, Settled in Lexington, Massachusetts and Some of His Posterity. 1900. James Munroe was a direct descendant of William Munroe. 
 The Destruction of the Convent at Charlestown, Massachusetts, 1834 about the Ursuline Convent Riots. 1901.
 The Massachusetts Institute of Technology (illustrated). 1902.
 William Barton Rogers: Founder of the Massachusetts Institute of Technology 1904.
 The Educational Ideal: An Outline of Its Growth in Modern Times (A part of Heath's Pedagogical Library). 1911. 
 New Demands in Education. 1912.
 The Business Man and the High-School Graduate. 1913.
 The New England Conscience. 1915.
 The War's Crippled: How They May Be Made Assets Both to Themselves and to Society. 1918. 
 The Advantages of National Auspices of Re-Education. 1918.
 The Human Factor of Education. 1921. Reprinted in 2009 by BiblioBazaar. 
  A Life of Francis Amasa Walker. 1923.

References

 
 
  (Makes mention of "A Life of Munroe" and his book, "A life of Francis Amasa Walker")

External links
Books of James Phinney Munroe
Excerpt from "Governmentality and the Mastery of Territory in Nineteenth-Century America"
Excerpts from "Lexington: From Liberty's Birthplace to Progressive Suburb"
Excerpt from "The Correspondence of[Alfred Marshall, Economist"
Excerpt from "Taylored Citizenship: State Institutions and Subjectivity"

Massachusetts Institute of Technology alumni
Massachusetts Institute of Technology faculty
1862 births
1929 deaths
American male writers